is a Japanese media mix project by Mages. The plot revolves around an election battle between idols who represent Japan's 47 prefectures. The character designs are handled by various artists such as CUTEG, Tiv, Mottsun*, Akemi Mikoto, Yōsai Kūchū, Mamu Mitsumoto, and Yukihiro Matsuo. The project was initially announced as a game that planned to be released in Fall 2014, but was postponed until August of the same year. In Summer 2015, the same project was "rebooted" with changes to the work including the stories and characters.

In 2016, an anime adaptation was announced and aired on Tokyo MX and BS Fuji in January 2017 and finished in March 2017.

Casts
Each character and their voice actress represent different prefectures in Japan.

 
 Sarara Yashima as  - Niigata Prefecture
 Mai Fuchigami as  - Fukuoka Prefecture
 Reina Ueda as  - Toyama Prefecture

 
 Lynn as  - Tokyo
 Haruka Terui as  - Iwate Prefecture
 Saeko Zōgō as  - Aichi Prefecture
 Satomi Akesaka as  - Saitama Prefecture
 Sarah Emi Bridcutt as  - Fukushima Prefecture
  - Gunma Prefecture
 Sora Amamiya as  - Tokyo
 Aya Suzaki as  - Ishikawa Prefecture
  - Mie Prefecture
  - Shimane Prefecture
 Misako Tomioka as  - Kōchi Prefecture
 Aya Tsuji as  - Ehime Prefecture
 Asuka Ōgame as  - Kumamoto Prefecture
 Atsumi Tanezaki as  - Ōita Prefecture
 Yurika Kubo as Sakurako Īzuka (飯塚 桜子 Īzuka Sakurako) - Nara Prefecture

Media

Game
A smartphone game published by HarvesT started its service on October 21, 2016. The game is free and uses an in-app purchase system. The game's servers closed on July 31, 2017.

Anime
In 2016, an anime adaptation was announced, produced by MAPPA and Studio VOLN. Daisuke Yoshida directed the anime with a script by Sōtarō Hayashi and Sumino Kawashima. Tiv drew the draft of the characters in the anime whilst Mai Ishii adapted the design. The series aired in Japan between January 8, 2017 and March 27, 2017. The opening theme titled  is sung by Smile♥X, a group formed by different members of each political party in the show, which produced by Tsunku. The ending theme "Respect" is sung by Sarara Yashima and Mai Fuchigami under the unit named "with.". Crunchyroll streamed the anime from January 8, 2017.

Episode list

Manga
A manga adaptation is serialised in Kadokawa's Dengeki G's Comic  and Comic Walker from the September 2016 issue and is illustrated by Coco Natsuki. The first volume was released on February 27, 2017.

Notes

References

External links
 

2017 anime television series debuts
MAPPA
Tokyo MX original programming
Japanese idols in anime and manga
Seinen manga
Otter Media franchises